Luis Romero Véliz (born 15 May 1984) is an Ecuadorian footballer who plays as a defender for S.D. Aucas.

References

External links

Ecuadorian footballers
1984 births
Living people
Ecuadorian Serie A players
Manta F.C. footballers
S.D. Quito footballers
L.D.U. Portoviejo footballers
L.D.U. Quito footballers
Guayaquil City F.C. footballers
S.D. Aucas footballers
People from Chone, Ecuador
Association football defenders